Armin Hofer (born March 19, 1987) is an Italian professional ice hockey defenceman. He is currently playing with the HC Pustertal Wölfe in the Italian Serie A.

He participated at the 2010 IIHF World Championship as a member of the Italian National men's ice hockey team.

References

External links

1987 births
Living people
Germanophone Italian people
Italian ice hockey defencemen
Sportspeople from Bruneck